The Goldenke is a river of Lower Saxony, Germany.

It rises at a height of 800 metres in the vicinity of the Hanskühnenburg on the ridge of Auf dem Acker, by the Goldenkerklippe crags. It then flows mainly in a southerly direction and empties into the River Sieber in the village of the same name.

See also
List of rivers of Lower Saxony

Rivers of Lower Saxony
Rivers of the Harz
Göttingen (district)
Rivers of Germany